Tlyarata is a rural locality (a selo) in Gumbetovsky District, Republic of Dagestan, Russia. The population was 578 as of 2010. There are 8 streets.

Geography 
Tlyarata is located 4 km east of Mekhelta (the district's administrative centre) by road. Mekhelta and Ingishi are the nearest rural localities.

References 

Rural localities in Gumbetovsky District